The Société d'économie mixte des transports publics de l'agglomération grenobloise (SÉMITAG) is a mixed public-private company and partner of the group Transdev, which operates since 1975, of behalf of the SMTC Grenoble, the entire bus and tramway network of the Grenoble-Alpes Métropole (TAG network) with a population of over 440 000 spread over 49 municipalities for a surface area of 541 km2.

Notes and references

See also 
 Grenoble tramway

External links 
 

Public transport operators in France
Organizations established in 1975
Transport in Grenoble